Hamza Zaidi,(born 9 November 1990) is an Algerian footballer who plays for USM Khenchela as a forward.

Club career
In 2021, Zaidi signed a contract with MC Alger.

References

External links

1990 births
Living people
Association football forwards
Algerian footballers
JS Saoura players
21st-century Algerian people
USM Khenchela players